Andrea Ercolani Volta (born 20 April 1995) is a Sammarinese athlete specialising in the 400 metres hurdles. He has won several medals at the Games of the Small States of Europe.

His personal best in the event is 52.32 seconds, set in Forli in 2022. This is the current national record.

International competitions

References

1995 births
Living people
Sammarinese male athletes
World Athletics Championships athletes for San Marino
Athletes (track and field) at the 2015 European Games
Athletes (track and field) at the 2018 Mediterranean Games
Athletes (track and field) at the 2022 Mediterranean Games
Mediterranean Games competitors for San Marino